Armand Léon de Baudry d'Asson (15 June 1836, in Rocheservière – 12 May 1915) was a French Legitimist politician. He was a member of the Chamber of Deputies from 1876 to 1914.

References

1836 births
1915 deaths
People from Vendée
Politicians from Pays de la Loire
Legitimists
Members of the 1st Chamber of Deputies of the French Third Republic
Members of the 2nd Chamber of Deputies of the French Third Republic
Members of the 3rd Chamber of Deputies of the French Third Republic
Members of the 4th Chamber of Deputies of the French Third Republic
Members of the 5th Chamber of Deputies of the French Third Republic
Members of the 6th Chamber of Deputies of the French Third Republic
Members of the 7th Chamber of Deputies of the French Third Republic
Members of the 8th Chamber of Deputies of the French Third Republic
Members of the 9th Chamber of Deputies of the French Third Republic
Members of the 10th Chamber of Deputies of the French Third Republic